Tripoli Eyalet was an eyalet of the Ottoman Empire. The capital was in Tripoli, Lebanon.

It extended along the coast, from the southern limits of the Amanus mountains in the north, to the gorge of Maameltein to the south, which separated it from the territory of the sanjak of Sidon-Beirut.

Along with the chiefly Sunni Muslim and Maronite Christian coastal towns of Latakia, Jableh, Baniyas, Tartus, Tripoli, Batrun and Byblos, the eyalet included the Wadi al-Nasara valley (the Valley of the Christians), the An-Nusayriyah Mountains, inhabited by Alawites, as well as the northern reaches of the Lebanon range, where the majority of inhabitants were Maronite Christians.

History
Ottoman rule in the region began in 1516, but the eyalet wasn't established until 1579, when it was created from the north-western districts of the eyalets of Damascus and Aleppo. Previously, it had been an eyalet for a few months in 1521.

From the time of the Ottoman conquest in 1516 until 1579, the affairs of the sanjak were under the control of the Turkoman ‘Assaf emirs of Ghazir in Kisrawan. When the eyalet was reconstituted in 1579, a new Turkoman family was put in charge, the Sayfas, and they held power until the death of the family's patriarch, Yusuf, in 1625. The Sayfas were frequently dismissed as governors, mainly for failing to meet their financial obligations to the state, rather than for being rebellious.

From 1800–08, 1810–20 and 1821–35 the governor of the eyalet was Mustafa Agha Barbar.

Administrative divisions
Eyalet consisted of five sanjaks between 1700 and 1740 as follows:

 Tripoli Sanjak (Trablus-Şam : Paşa Sancağı, Tripoli)
 Hama Sanjak (Hama Sancağı, Hama)
 Homs Sanjak (Hums Sancağı, Homs)
 Salamieh Sanjak (Selemiyye Sancağı, Salamiyah)
 Jebella Sanjak or Jebellieh Sanjak (Cebeliyye Sancağı, Jableh)

References

Eyalets of the Ottoman Empire in Asia
1579 establishments in the Ottoman Empire
1864 disestablishments in Ottoman Syria